Karm Yuddh is a Hindi-language web series written by Rehan Khan, directed by Ravi Adhikari, starring Satish Kaushik, Ashutosh Rana, Paoli Dam, Anjana Sukhani, Sachin Parikh, Pranay Pachauri, Ankit Bisht, Tara Alisha Berry, Madhurima Roy, Soundharya Sharma, Sabyasachi Chakraborty, Satyajit Sharma, Faizal Rashid, Satyadeep Mishra, Ashit Chatterjee, Rajesh Khattar and Nitin Merani.

Plot 
A family-revenge drama with an emphasis on the "Roy" family, the web series tells its story through its characters. The chairmanship of the Roy Group of Industries is up for grabs in a power battle between two individuals. How far will the contestants go when their aspirations are so high?

Cast 
 Ashutosh Rana as Guru Shastri
 Satish Kaushik as Bhisham Roy
 Rajesh Khattar as Vardhaan Roy
 Paoli Dam as Indrani Roy
 Soundarya Sharma as Payal Rana
 Rituraj Singh as Viral Motvani
 Chandan Roy Sanyal as Aadesh Baghchi
 Satyajit Sharma as Iqbal Singh Bajwa 
 Tara Alisha Berry as Fiza Ayubi
 Madhurima Roy as Hunar Agarwal
 Anjana Sukhani as Mounisha
 Pranay Pachauri as Samar Shastri
 Ankit Bisht as Abhimanyu Roy
 Akash Dhar as Saahas Allu
 Kundan Roy as Local CBI
 Rajneesh Sharma as Local CBI
 Nitin Mirani as Raghuveer Singh
 Shruti Chauhan as Rashi Motvani
 Malkhan Singh Gaur as Factory Fire Survivor
 Aashit Chatterjee as Kannu Sudarshan
 Sachin Parikh as Debashish, Bhisham's PA
 Gavin Methalaka as George Masih
 Pranay Narayan as Gajanand Agarwal, Hunar's Father
 Reshma Merchant as Maitri Agarwal, Hunar's Mother
 Atharv Padhye as Ninad Agarwal, Hunar's Brother
 Radhika Chauhan as Radhika, Hunar's Friend
 Amy Aela as Isabelle
 Utkarsh Kohli as Tapish
 Vishnu Sharma as Indrani's Father, Ex-Police Commissioner
 Pragya Mishra as Naxalite
 Sudhakar Gaonkar as Naxalite
 Manish Kumar as Naxalite
 Madhu Awasthi as Naxalite

Release 
Karm Yuddh was released on 30 September 2022 on Disney+ Hotstar.

Reception 
Poorna Banerjee of The Times of India rated the web series 2.5 stars out of 5 and wrote "The lack of cohesiveness or believability also leaves one with plenty of loose ends that the director seems to ignores as long as his purpose is served."

Manik Sharma of Firstpost wrote "The show’s biggest problem isn’t that it has a predictable done-to-death template, but the fact that it can’t even stay true to the Succession-esque powergrab at the heart of the show."

Bhawana Bisht of SheThePeople wrote "Interestingly, the show is not just a revenge drama, it also serves as a love story connecting dots where Abhimanyu Roy pursues a girl (played by Madhurima Roy) consistently, and even molests her, making her eventually fall in love with him, but that angle doesn’t work much because of its drag and the fact that the audience is far beyond romanticising stalking on screen."

Archi Sengupta of Leisurebyte rated 2 out of 5 stars and wrote "We sit there, episode after episode, getting a minute or two of the interesting stuff while watching silly things happen for hours on end. Especially in this Abhimanyu Roy storyline – we see him being an entitled molester, creep and stalker, all the while romantic music plays in the back."

Sunidhi Prajapat of OTTplay rated 3.5 stars out of 5 and wrote "The Naxal angle, which appears to be an unnecessary approach by the makers to make it even more intense and suspenseful, This angle surely makes the show longer, which feels like a stretch after a while. However, the impressive performances of most of the actors balance out the show."

References

External links 

2022 web series debuts
Disney+ Hotstar original programming
Hindi-language Disney+ Hotstar original programming